The Armenian diaspora refers to the communities of Armenians outside Armenia and other locations where Armenians are considered an indigenous population. Since antiquity, Armenians have established communities in many regions throughout the world. However, the modern Armenian diaspora was largely formed as a result of World War I, when the Armenian genocide committed by the Ottoman Empire forced Armenians living in their homeland to flee or risk being killed. Another wave of emigration started with the dissolution of the Soviet Union.

Terminology
In Armenian, the diaspora is referred to as spyurk, spelled սփիւռք in classical orthography and սփյուռք in reformed orthography. In the past, the word gaghut (գաղութ ) was used mostly to refer to the Armenian communities outside the Armenian homeland. It is borrowed from the Aramaic (Classical Syriac) cognate of Hebrew galut (גלות).

History
The Armenian diaspora has been present for over 1,700 years. The modern Armenian diaspora was formed largely after World War I as a result of the Armenian genocide. According to Randall Hansen, "Both in the past and today, the Armenian communities around the world have developed in significantly different ways within the constraints and opportunities found in varied host cultures and countries."

In the fourth century, Armenian communities already existed outside of Greater Armenia. Diasporic Armenian communities emerged in the Achaemenid and Sassanid empires, and also to defend the eastern and northern borders of the Byzantine Empire. In order to populate the less populated areas of Byzantium, Armenians were relocated to those regions. Some Armenians converted to Greek Orthodoxy while retaining Armenian as their primary language, whereas others remained in the Armenian Apostolic Church despite pressure from official authorities. A growing number of Armenians migrated to Cilicia during the course of the eleventh and twelfth centuries as a result of the Seljuk Turk invasions. After the fall of the kingdom to the Mamelukes and loss of Armenian statehood in 1375, up to 150,000 went to Cyprus, the Balkans, and Italy. Although an Armenian diaspora existed during Antiquity and the Middle Ages, it grew in size due to emigration from the Ottoman Empire, Iran, Russia, and the Caucasus.

The Armenian diaspora is divided into two communities – those from Ottoman Armenia (or Western Armenia) and those who are from the former Soviet Union, the independent Armenia and Iran (or Eastern Armenia).

Armenians of the modern Republic of Turkey do not consider themselves as part of the Armenian Diaspora, since they believe that they continue residing in their historical homeland.

Before 1870, there were 60 Armenian immigrants settled in New England. Armenian immigration rose to 1,500 by the end of the 1880s, and rose to 2,500 in the mid-1890s due to massacres caused by the Ottoman Empire. Armenians who immigrated to the United States before WWI were primarily from Asia Minor and settled on the East Coast.

The Armenian diaspora grew considerably during and after the First World War due to the dissolution of the Ottoman Empire. In the year 1910, over 5,500 Armenians immigrated to the United States, and by 1913, 9,355 more Armenians entered the North American borders. As World War I approached, the rate of Armenian immigration rose to about 60,000. In 1920 and until the Immigration Act of 1924, 30,771 Armenians came to the United States; the immigrants were predominantly widowed women, children, and orphans. Although many Armenians perished during the Armenian genocide, some of the Armenians who managed to escape, established themselves in various parts of the world. 

By 1966, around 40 years after the start of the Armenian genocide, 2 million Armenians still lived in Armenia, while 330,000 lived in Russia, and 450,000 lived in the United States and Canada. 

The immigration rate increased after the Immigration Act was liberated in 1965. Civil War in Lebanon in 1975 and the Islamic Revolution in Iran during 1978 were push factors for Armenians to immigrate. The 1980 U.S. Census reported 90 percent of immigration to the United States by Iranian-Armenians occurred during the years 1975 and 1980.

Distribution

Less than one third of the world's Armenian population lives in Armenia. Their pre-World War I population area was six times larger than that of present-day Armenia, including the eastern regions of Turkey, northern part of Iran, and the southern part of Georgia.

By 2000, there were 7,580,000 Armenians living abroad in total.

See also
Armenia–European Union relations
Foreign relations of Armenia
Largest Armenian diaspora communities
List of diasporas
Visa requirements for Armenian citizens

References

Bibliography

External links

Ovenk.com
Armenian Ministry of Diaspora official website
Hayern Aysor (Armenians Today) Official site of the Armenian Ministry of the Diaspora
ArmDiasporaMuseum.com
 The Armenian Diaspora Today: Anthropological Perspectives. Articles in the Caucasus Anallytical Digest No. 29